is a passenger railway station located in the city of Inabe, Mie Prefecture, Japan, operated by the private railway operator Sangi Railway.

Lines
Sohara Station is served by the Hokusei Line, and is located 14.4 kilometres from the terminus of the line at Nishi-Kuwana Station.

Layout
The station consists of two unnumbered opposed side platforms connected to the station building by a level crossing.

Platforms

Adjacent stations

History
Sohara Station was opened on April 5, 1914, as a station of the Hokusei Railway, which became the Hokusei Electric Railway on June 27, 1934. Through a series of mergers, the line became part of the Kintetsu group on April 1, 1965. A new station building was completed in September 1992. On April 1, 2003, the Sangi Railway was spun out of Kintetsu as an independent company.

Passenger statistics
In fiscal 2019, the station was used by an average of 630 passengers daily (boarding passengers only).

Surrounding area
Inabe City Hall
Prefectural Inabe Sogo Gakuen High School

See also
List of railway stations in Japan

References

External links

Sangi Railway official home page

Railway stations in Japan opened in 1914
Railway stations in Mie Prefecture
Inabe, Mie